Below is a list of vernacular/street dances, varying from traditional to modern electronic styles.

See also
List of ethnic, regional, and folk dances sorted by origin

Dance-related lists